Maribel Blanco Velasco (born 12 January 1969) is an athlete from Spain who competes in triathlon.

Blanco competed at the first Olympic triathlon at the 2000 Summer Olympics. She took twenty-fourth place with a total time of 2:06:37.84.

References

1969 births
Living people
Spanish female triathletes
Triathletes at the 2000 Summer Olympics
Olympic triathletes of Spain
Duathletes